The discography of James Morrison, an English singer, songwriter, and guitarist, consists of five studio albums, two EPs, twenty singles, twenty-one music videos, and a number of other appearances.

Morrison released Undiscovered, his debut album, in 2006. It topped the UK Albums Chart and reached the top ten in other countries and was certified three times platinum by the British Phonographic Industry. Morrison was also the biggest-selling British male solo artist in 2006. His debut single was also his most successful; "You Give Me Something" reached the top ten in nine countries including peaks of number five on the UK Singles Chart and number one in New Zealand. Morrison's second album, Songs for You, Truths for Me, was released in September 2008. It reached number three in the UK, and the top 20 in six other countries. The two albums have sold some 4.5 million copies. In September 2011 Morrison released his third album The Awakening, which debuted at number one in the UK.

Albums

Studio albums

Compilation albums

Extended plays

Singles

As lead artist

As featured artist

Other charted songs

Music videos

Songwriting credits

Other appearances

Notes

References

External links
James Morrison official site

Discographies of British artists
Pop music discographies